St. Conleth's College is a private co-educational Catholic school founded on 4 September 1939 by Bernard Sheppard.

History
The school was named after Conleth, a sixth-century Irish monk who was a moulder of precious metals and whose feast day is 4 May. The senior school has about 300 pupils and is co-educational. It has a teaching staff of 25. The junior school has about 160 pupils and is also co-educational. It has grown steadily since it opened and the school building at 28 Clyde Road, Ballsbridge, Dublin 4, is now significantly different from its original state.

The Millennium extension saw the addition of a half court school hall, canteen and additional classrooms as well as a computer lab and resurfacing of playing facilities. In 2009 the school underwent reconstruction again, resulting in an additional floor and re-modelling of the interior.

In November 2017, the Kevin Kelleher Wing was opened which added a performance room and study area on top of the gymnasium.

Management 
Kevin D. Kelleher (1921 - 2016), former international rugby referee, was the headmaster of the school for over 46 years.

Ann Sheppard (the daughter of Bernard Sheppard and step-daughter of Kevin Kelleher) was school principal from 1988–2001 and was CEO until 2021.

Donal Ó Dúlaing is the principal of the Senior School.

Angelina Hopkins is the deputy principal of the Senior School.

Tony Kilcommons was principal of the junior school until he became CEO of St. Conleth's in 2021.

Dolores Kelly is the head of Preparatory School (Junior Infants - 1st Form)

Academics
The school first topped the fee-paying schools league table in 2003. However, due to its relatively small size some newspapers omit the school from league tables.  

Subjects offered by the school for the Leaving Certificate include but are not limited to: maths, English, Irish, French, biology, chemistry, physics, business, economics, Spanish, geography, classical studies, Latin, history, applied mathematics, music and art.

Sport
Rugby is considered the primary sport of the school and both Junior and Senior Cup Team are represented in the Leinster Cups. Leinster Rugby did a focus on rugby in St. Conleth's in 2016 to recognise its successes that year.

St. Conleth's won the Basketball Ireland National Cup and League double in 2009 at the U16 Boys B level. The school hasalso won several South Dublin Basketball League Championships, the most recent being the 2013 First Year (Minor) Championship. 

St. Conleth's have participated in fencing for decades and is available as a sport in the school for both boys and girls from a young age.  In June 2019, a past pupil, Philip Lee, became Ireland's first-ever European Champion in Fencing.

Hockey is the latest sport to be played in St. Conleth's. The Minor Girls Hockey team played their first game on a full pitch in October 2018 and 5 months later they beat Loreto Beaufort in the final having seen off Dundalk Grammar in the semi final and Mount Anville in the quarter finals.

Debating
St. Conleth's debating tradition is recorded in the minutes of the school's Literary and Debating Society dating back to the 1940s.  The 2000s saw St Conleth's win four Irish World's Schools representatives followed by victories in the Trinity College Schools Mace and the University College Dublin School's Mace. In 2010, St. Conleth's began hosting an annual Junior Mace Debating competition. In 2014 there were three Conlethians representing Team Ireland at the World Schools Debating Championship in Bangkok, Thailand.

In 2019, St. Conleth's had two winners in the grand final of the Irish Times Debate with Kevin Roche (representing the Kings Inns) winning the individual competition and Daniel Gilligan (representing TCD Hist Society) won the team competition.  Another past pupil, Conor White, was a losing finalist.

Past pupils' union 
St.Conleth's Past Pupils' Union has been active for over 70 years and every year holds a dinner, a black tie event, at the school on the last Friday of February or the first Friday of March (depending on when the Irish rugby team do not have a fixture).

References

External links
 School's website
 Past Pupil's Website

Secondary schools in Dublin (city)
Private schools in the Republic of Ireland
Boys' schools in the Republic of Ireland